Portelli is an Italian and Maltese surname. Notable people with the surname include:
 Alessandro Portelli (born 1942), Italian scholar of American literature and culture
 Angelo Portelli, born Francis Saviour Portelli (1852−1927), Maltese auxiliary Bishop of Malta
 Carlo Portelli (1539-1574), Italian painter of the Renaissance period
 Frank Portelli, former member of the Maltese Parliament
 Freddie Portelli (born 1944), Maltese singer and songwriter
 Guy Portelli (born 1957), British sculptor
 Ġużepp Portelli (1880–1949), Maltese Roman Catholic prelate
 Hugues Portelli (born 1947, member of the Senate of France
 John Peter Portelli (born 1954), Maltese educationist and philosopher
Leo Portelli (born 1946), Maltese archer, competitor at the 1980 Summer Olympics
 Nikolai Portelli (born 1981), Maltese athlete

See also
Ortelli
Portel (disambiguation)
Sportelli

Italian-language surnames